Ghanpur (Station) Assembly constituency, also Station Ghanpur, is a scheduled caste reserved constituency of Telangana Legislative Assembly, India. It is one of three constituencies in Jangaon district. It is part of Warangal Lok Sabha constituency.

T. Rajaiah, who served as Deputy Chief Minister of Telangana is representing this constituency since its inception in 2009.

Mandals

Members of Legislative Assembly

Election results

Telangana Legislative Assembly election, 2018

Telangana Legislative Assembly election, 2014

See also
 List of constituencies of Telangana Legislative Assembly

References

Assembly constituencies of Telangana
Hanamkonda district